This is a list of places named Expo Center or Expo Centre.

Belgium

Tilmans Expo Centre, Bree, Limburg

Canada

Edmonton Expo Centre, Edmonton, Alberta
Expo Centre, Vancouver, British Columbia

China

Hong Kong Convention and Expo Centre, Hong Kong
Shanghai New International Expo Center, Shanghai

Netherlands

Frisian Expo Centre, Leeuwarden, Friesland

Pakistan
Expo Centre Lahore, Johar Town, Lahore
Karachi Expo Centre, Gulshan Town, Karachi

Russia

Moscow Expo Center, Moscow

South Africa

Expo Centre Johannesburg, Gauteng

Turkey

Antalya Expo Center, Antalya, Antalya

United Arab Emirates
Expo Centre Sharjah, Sharjah

United States

Americraft Expo Center, West Palm Beach, Florida
Bell County Expo Center, Belton, Texas
Birch Run Expo Center, Birch Run, Michigan
Cedar Creek Ice & Expo Center, Wausau, Wisconsin
Chisholm Trail Expo Center, Enid, Oklahoma
Cocoa Expo Sports Center, Cocoa, Florida
Eastern Kentucky Expo Center, Pikeville, Kentucky
Empire Expo Center, Syracuse, New York
Fair Expo Center, Miami, Florida
Industry Hills Expo Center, Industry, California
Kansas Expo Center, Topeka, Kansas
Kentucky Expo Center, Louisville, Kentucky
Lone Star Expo Center, Conroe, Texas
Macomb Sports and Expo Center, Warren, Michigan
Odeum Expo Center, Villa Park, Illinois
Ohio Expo Center and State Fairgrounds, Columbus, Ohio
Pennsylvania Farm Show Complex & Expo Center, Harrisburg, Pennsylvania
Portland Expo Center, Portland, Oregon
Expo Center (MAX station), Portland, Oregon
Sands Expo and Convention Center, Las Vegas, Nevada
Shrine Expo Center, Los Angeles, California
Taylor County Expo Center, Abilene, Texas
Tulsa Expo Center, Tulsa, Oklahoma
Volusia County Fair and Expo Center, DeLand, Florida

See also
Expo (disambiguation)
List of convention and exhibition centers